Making Out is a series of young adult novels by authors K. A. Applegate and Michael Grant. The series was formerly known as "Boyfriends/Girlfriends" and the first eight books were republished in 2015 as The Islanders. The books focus on the lives of teenagers living on Chatham Island, a fictional island off the coast of Maine. The main characters early in the series are Zoey Passmore and her brother Benjamin, Claire Geiger and her sister Nina, Jake McRoyan, Lucas Cabral, and Aisha Gray.

The books deal with several difficult topics such as the death of a parent, child sexual abuse, divorce, disability, drugs, and alcohol, and follow the effect of these issues on the characters' lives, from their senior year in high school to life in college.

The series was published in German with an additional 29th book. 
Books from the series have also been translated into Bulgarian, Czech, Dutch, French, Greek, Hungarian, Lithuanian, and Thai.

List of books
There are 28 books in the whole series, but only the first eight books were written by Katherine Applegate. Books #9-28 were ghostwritten.

 Zoey Fools Around
 Jake Finds Out
 Nina Won't Tell
 Ben's In Love
 Claire Gets Caught
 What Zoey Saw
 Lucas Gets Hurt
 Aisha Goes Wild
 Zoey Plays Games
 Nina Shapes Up
 Ben Takes a Chance
 Claire Can't Lose
 Don't Tell Zoey
 Aaron Lets Go
 Who Loves Kate?
 Lara Gets Even
 Two-Timing Aisha
 Zoey Speaks Out
 Kate Finds Love
 Never Trust Lara
 Trouble with Aaron
 Always Loving Zoey
 Lara Gets Lucky
 Now Zoey's Alone
 Don't Forget Lara
 Zoey's Broken Heart
 Falling for Claire
 Zoey Comes Home

References

Young adult novel series
Novels by K. A. Applegate
Collaborative book series
1990s novels
Novels set in Maine
Novels set on islands
Novels by Michael Grant